Shanika Jamila Bruce (born 20 February 1995) is a Barbadian cricketer who plays for the Barbados women's national cricket team in the Women's Super50 Cup and the Twenty20 Blaze tournaments. In April 2019, Bruce was named as one of six reserve players for the West Indies' tour of England and Ireland. In April 2021, Bruce was named in Cricket West Indies' high-performance training camp in Antigua. Bruce is also studying for a degree at the University of the West Indies.

In June 2021, Bruce was named in the West Indies A Team for their series against Pakistan. In July 2022, she was named in the Barbados team for the cricket tournament at the 2022 Commonwealth Games in Birmingham, England. She made her Women's Twenty20 International (WT20I) debut on 29 July 2022, for Barbados against Pakistan at the Commonwealth Games.

References

External links
 
 

1995 births
Living people
Barbadian women cricketers
Place of birth missing (living people)
West Indies women Twenty20 International cricketers
Barbados women Twenty20 International cricketers
Barbados Royals (WCPL) cricketers
Cricketers at the 2022 Commonwealth Games
Commonwealth Games competitors for Barbados